Harry Lillis Crosby III (born August 8, 1958) is an American investment banker and former actor.

Personal life
Crosby was born at Hollywood Presbyterian Medical Center in Los Angeles, California. He is the fifth son of actor and singer Bing Crosby, and the eldest from Bing's second marriage to actress Kathryn Crosby. Harry is the elder brother of Mary and Nathaniel Crosby; the younger half-brother of Gary, Dennis, Phillip and Lindsay Crosby; the half-uncle of Denise Crosby; and the nephew of Bob Crosby and Larry Crosby.

Crosby has been in investment banking since 1985 and is a partner at Cranemere. He attended the London Academy of Music and Dramatic Art from 1977 to 1980 and received an MBA at Gabelli School of Business of Fordham University.

Investment banking and private equity
Crosby began his career at Lehman Brothers in 1987, working from associate level to director.

In 1993, he became managing director of the Credit Suisse Financial Sponsors Group, where he established key relationships. He subsequently became group head and managing director of North America Financial Sponsors Group at Merrill Lynch, where he managed clients such as KKR, Carlyle and Bain.

In 2005, he became general partner at Snow Phipps, a private equity firm specializing in leveraged acquisitions, build-ups, recapitalizations, restructuring, and growth equity investments, of small to middle market companies. He was involved in the firm's sale of Excel Mining Systems to Orica for approximately $670mn.

In 2012, he became general partner at Cranemere, investing in middle market private companies in North America, Germany and Austria. Crosby has also served on a number of other corporate boards, including that of Excel Mining Systems.

Philanthropy
Crosby has served on philanthropic boards, including the Monterey Peninsula Foundation, a charitable organisation that funds education, health, human services, arts, community and environmental projects.

As a trained musician, he is also an active fundraiser and board member of Jazz at Lincoln Center, a major performing arts institution structured as a non-profit organization and housed at the Time Warner Center in Manhattan, New York. He has worked alongside the likes of Wynton Marsalis, jazz trumpeter and artistic director of Jazz at Lincoln Center.

Film and television
Before his career in banking and private equity, Crosby gained show business experience at an early age by appearing with his father and family on various Christmas television specials from 1965 to 1977 and at the London Palladium in 1976 and 1977. He has appeared in several films and television programs, including The Hollywood Palace, Friday the 13th, Riding for the Pony Express, and The Private History of a Campaign That Failed.

Filmography

References

External links

1958 births
Living people
American investment bankers
American male film actors
American male television actors
20th-century American male actors
American male singers
American people of English descent
American people of Irish descent
Singers from California
Male actors from Hollywood, Los Angeles
Gabelli School of Business alumni
Bing Crosby
Businesspeople from Los Angeles